The Kherson Art Museum (also known as the Shovkunenko Kherson Regional Art Museum) is an art museum in Kherson, Ukraine.  It is housed in Kherson's former city hall building.

During the 2022 Russian invasion of Ukraine, the museum was looted by Russian troops while Kherson was occupied.  A short time before the city was liberated by Ukrainian forces, the Russians stuffed almost 15 000 works of art carelessly into trucks and buses.  The collection was moved to the Central Museum of Taurida in Simferopol in Russian-occupied Crimea, where the museum director Andrei Malgin claimed that the move was made to ensure the safety of the artworks until they could be returned to the rightful owner.  The Kherson police opened investigation into what they saw as a war crime.  The deliberate Russian destruction and looting of more than 500 Ukrainian cultural heritage sites has been considered by Ukraine's Minister of Culture as cultural genocide.

References

See also 
 Ukrainian cultural heritage during the 2022 Russian invasion

uk:Херсонський художній музей імені Олексія Шовкуненка
Art museums and galleries in Ukraine
Kherson
Art museums established in 1978